The Diane class was a pair of submarines built for the French Navy during World War I.

Ships

Notes

Bibliography

 

Submarine classes
World War I submarines of France
Ship classes of the French Navy